The Albany Trust was founded in the United Kingdom as a registered charity in May 1958 to complement the Homosexual Law Reform Society (HLRS). It takes its name from The Albany, in Piccadilly, London, where J.B. Priestley and his wife Jacquetta Hawkes had an apartment, and at which the trust's earliest meetings were held.

The goal of the Trust is to "promote psychological health in men by collecting data and conducting research: to publish the results thereof by writing, films, lectures and other media: to take suitable steps based thereon for the public benefit to improve the social and general conditions necessary for such healthy psychological development."

The founding Trustees were A.E. Dyson, Jacquetta Hawkes, Kenneth Walker, Andrew Hallidie Smith, and Ambrose Appelbe.

The Albany Trust developed into a pioneering counselling organisation for gay men, lesbians and sexual minorities.

The funds raised and donated for the work of the Albany Trust allowed it to open offices in October 1958. These facilities, at 32 Shaftesbury Avenue, were then also available for the campaigning work of the HLRS. The longtime "public face" of these activities was Antony Grey, from 1962 Secretary of both the Albany Trust and the HLRS (the latter later being renamed the Sexual Law Reform Society).

After the Sexual Offences Act 1967 partially decriminalised homosexual relationships between adult men, the Albany Trust became an educational and counselling organisation. From 1967 the Trust was also involved the development of sex education. For example, this included support and advice for the Dorian Society of New Zealand.

The Albany Trust, with help from the Paedophile Information Exchange and the Paedophile Action for Liberation, published a booklet on paedophilia. The book was controversial, and campaigners such as Mary Whitehouse claimed that this showed that public funds were being used to subsidise pro-paedophile groups; however, PIE and PAL did not receive public funding directly.

See also

List of LGBT medical organisations
London Friend

Further reading
 Antony Grey, Quest for justice: Towards homosexual emancipation, London, 1992. 
 Jeffrey Weeks, Coming out: Homosexual politics in Britain, from the nineteenth century to the present, London, 1977.

References

External links
 
 Catalogue of the Albany Trust papers at the Archives Division of the London School of Economics.

Organizations established in 1958
LGBT organisations in England
LGBT culture in London
1958 establishments in the United Kingdom
Pedophile advocacy